Carter-Wallace was a personal care company headquartered in New York City. The company was formed by the merger of Carter Products and Wallace Laboratories. The company has a research facility in Cranbury, New Jersey.

History
The company was formed as Carter Medicine Company  which was incorporated in 1880 by John Samuel Carter of Erie, Pennsylvania. John Carter died in 1884 and his son, Samuel Carter took over. John Higgins Wallace Jr., a research chemist from Princeton, New Jersey was hired and he formulated Arrid deodorant in 1935.

In 2001 the consumer product line was sold to Church and Dwight and MedPointe bought the diagnostics and drug businesses.

CEOs
John Samuel Carter (?-1884) 1880 to 1884.
Samuel J. Carter, son of John.
Brent Good, a New York businessman that convinced John to incorporate.
Harry Good, son of Brent.
Charles Orcutt, brother-in-law of Harry.
Henry Hamilton Hoyt Sr., son-in-law of Charles; bought a controlling interest in the company.
Henry Hamilton Hoyt Jr.

Timeline
1859: Carter's Little Liver Pills compounded in a four room building in Erie, Pennsylvania.
1880: Carter Medicine Company is incorporated.
1929: Henry Hamilton Hoyt Sr. becomes company's managing director.
1935: Arrid antiperspirant introduced.
1937: Carter Medicine Company becomes Carter Products.
1940: Nair depilatory introduced.
1949: Rise shaving cream, the first pressurized shave cream is introduced.
1961: Henry Hamilton Hoyt Jr., becomes company chairman.
1965: Carter Products is renamed Carter-Wallace.
1985: Youngs Drug Products acquired.
1988: Sea & Ski sold to Fabergé
1989: Hygeia Sciences acquired.
1993: Felbatol, a medication for epileptics, is launched and later withdrawn from the market.
1999: Trojan condom Supra, the first polyurethane condom is introduced. 
2000: Henry Hamilton Hoyt Jr. retires.
2001: MedPointe buys the pharmaceutical pipeline and the Carter-Wallace name, and Church and Dwight buys the personal care brands.

Products
Arrid deodorant 
Carter's Laxative, which was originally known as Carter's Little Liver Pills and after 1959 as Carter's Little Pills.
First Response
Lambert Kay
Meprobamate, marketed as Miltown
Nair depilatory
Pearl Drops
Carisoprodol, marketed as Soma
Trojan condoms
Simeticone, marketed as Ovol
Dimenhydrinate, marketed as Gravol
Aluminum Hydroxide, Magnesium Hydroxide, and Simethicone, antiacid antiflatulent preparation, marketed as Diovol
Pepsin preparation, marketed as Fermentol

References

 
Companies based in New Jersey
Companies based in New York City